Marius Silver Jubilee, better known as  Milton (16 February 1977 – 4 July 1999) was a successful showjumping horse ridden by John Whitaker.

Biography 
Foaled in 1977, Milton was by Dutch Warmblood Marius, out of Irish Draught Aston Answers. His lines included successful sportshorses in both paternal and maternal lines, his sire being an international level and his dam a Grade A national level jumper.

When Milton was young, Caroline Bradley, who had ridden Marius to international success, told her parents he would be her Olympic mount. She trained him until her death in 1983, after which many offers were made to her parents to buy the gelding, who had already proven his talent. They kept the horse. Stephen Hadley, known later as a FEI TV show jumping commentator, rode Milton for a short time, before he became a mount of the world-renowned international rider John Whitaker. Milton entered international competition in 1985.

Career
During his competitive career, Milton achieved many international victories, and became the first horse outside the racing world to win more than £1 million in prize money. Throughout his career, Milton rarely touched a rail or refused a fence. The gelding was a favourite with the crowd, many times ending a successful round with a leap into the air. Even after his retirement at the 1994 Olympia Horse Show, he was adored by all. Milton died on 4 July 1999. He was buried on the Whitakers' farm in Yorkshire.

Achievements
 Over £1 million in prize money won
 Winner of the 1986 Du Maurier Limited International competition, Spruce Meadows, then the richest (in total prize money) show jumping competition in the world.
 Individual Silver and Team Gold 1987 European Championships in St Gallen
 Individual and Team Gold 1989 European Championships in Rotterdam
 Winner of the 1990 FEI World Cup Final in Dortmund
 Individual Silver and Team Bronze 1990 World Equestrian Games in Stockholm
 Winner of the 1991 FEI World Cup Final in Gothenburg

See also
 List of historical horses

References
European Championship pdf. file
World Cup Finals
World Equestrian Games

External links
 Pedigree and photo
Horse & Hound - Great Horses in History

Show jumping horses
Individual warmbloods
Individual male horses
1977 animal births
1999 animal deaths